Nels Courtney Cline (born January 4, 1956) is an American guitarist and composer. He has been the guitarist for the band Wilco since 2004.

In the 1980s he played jazz, often in collaboration with his twin brother Alex, a percussionist. He has worked with musicians in punk and alternative rock such as Carla Bozulich and the Geraldine Fibbers, Mike Watt and Thurston Moore. He leads the Nels Cline Singers, Nels Cline Trio, and the Nels Cline 4.

Cline was named the 82nd greatest guitarist of all time by Rolling Stone magazine in November 2011.

Career

Cline began to play guitar at age 12 when his twin brother Alex Cline started playing drums. The brothers developed together musically, playing in a rock band called Homogenized Goo. Both graduated from University High School. Cline cites hearing a recording of Jimi Hendrix performing "Manic Depression" as a defining moment in his decision to become a guitarist.

Cline has performed on over 150 albums in jazz, pop, rock, country, and experimental music. He was featured in a cover story by Guitar Player magazine for his work with the rock band Wilco.

Personal life
Cline is married to Yuka Honda of Cibo Matto. Their wedding was in Honda's hometown in Japan in November 2010. They met through Mike Watt when he assembled the group Floored by Four.  Cline joined Honda as a guest guitarist in the Yoko Ono Plastic Ono band for their tour in 2010. Cline joined Honda and her band Cibo Matto at the 2015 Solid Sound Festival.

Discography

As leader

With Acoustic Guitar Trio

With Banyan

With Quartet Music

With Wilco

With other bands

As sideman

References

External links
Official Website
Q&A about Cline's DIRTY BABY project
State of Mind - Conversation with Nels Cline - June 2007
State of Mind - Conversation with Nels Cline - May 2012

1956 births
Living people
Avant-garde jazz musicians
American male composers
20th-century American guitarists
21st-century American guitarists
American jazz guitarists
American rock guitarists
American male guitarists
University High School (Los Angeles) alumni
Wilco members
Guitarists from Los Angeles
20th-century American composers
American male jazz musicians
Big Walnuts Yonder members
The Nels Cline Singers members
Atavistic Records artists
Enja Records artists
Mack Avenue Records artists
RogueArt artists